Fulwell may refer to:

Fulwell, London
Fulwell, Oxfordshire
Fulwell, Sunderland
Fulwell & Westbury railway station